José López Silva may refer to:

 José López Silva (playwright) (1861–1925), Spanish playwright
 José López Silva (footballer) (born 1983), Spanish footballer